The Filmfare Best Director Award is given by the Filmfare magazine as part of its annual Filmfare Awards South for Tamil (Kollywood) films. The awards were extended to "Best Director" in 1972.

Superlatives

K. Balachander has the record of winning most awards with 7 and winning the Award twice in a row, on two separate occasions (1974–1975 and 1980–1981). Mani Ratnam have received the award for five times which is the second most wins. Cheran have received the award four times.
Sudha Kongara was the first of two women to have won this award for Irudhi Suttru in 2016, the second being Gayathri of Pushkar–Gayathri duo for Vikram Vedha in 2017. Other woman Director to have been nominated is Suhasini Maniratnam for Indira .
S. Shankar remains the only Director to have won the Award for his first two films, Gentleman and Kadhalan .
S. Shankar, Cheran , Bala , and Sasikumar are the four directors who have received the award for their first film.
K. Balachander has most nominations with 18, followed by Bharathiraja and Mani Ratnam with 13.

Multiple nominations

18 nominations :K. Balachander 
13 nominations :Bharathiraja, Mani Ratnam 
9 nominations :S. Shankar 
7 nominations :S. P. Muthuraman, Balu Mahendra, Vikraman 
6 nominations :K. S. Ravikumar, A. R. Murugadoss 
5 nominations :Singeetam Srinivasa Rao, K. Bhagyaraj, Cheran, Bala 
4 nominations :Gautham Vasudev Menon, Vetrimaaran 
3 nominations :Fazil, Mohan Raja, Vasanthabalan, P. Vasu, Selvaraghavan, Mahendran, Pa. Ranjith 
2 nominations :P. Madhavan, C. V. Sridhar, A. C. Tirulokchandar, R. Sundarrajan, K. V. Anand, Manivannan, Atlee, Ram Kumar, Ameer Sultan, Prabhu Solomon, Hari, A. L. Vijay, Kamal Haasan, Balaji Sakthivel, Mysskin, Priyadarshan, Rajiv Menon, R. Parthiban, Sundar. C, A. Jagannathan, Sudha Kongara, Mari Selvaraj

Multiple wins
7 wins: K. Balachander 
5 wins: Mani Ratnam
4 wins: Cheran 
3 wins: S. Shankar, Bala 
2 wins: Bharathiraja, S. P. Muthuraman, Vasanthabalan, Balu Mahendra, Sudha Kongara

Winners

Nominations

1970s
1972 – P. Madhavan – Pattikada Pattanama
1973 – A. C. Tirulokchandar – Bharatha Vilas 
1974 – K. Balachander – Aval Oru Thodar Kathai
 C. V. Sridhar – Urimai Kural
 Singeetam Srinivasa Rao – Dikkatra Parvathi
1975 – K. Balachander – Apoorva Raagangal
 A. C. Tirulokchandar – Anbe Aaruyire
 A. Jagannathan – Idhayakkani
1976 – S. P. Muthuraman – Oru Oodhappu Kan Simittugiradhu
 Devaraj–Mohan – Annakili
 K. Balachander – Moondru Mudichu
 P. Madhavan – Chitra Pournami
 S. P. Muthuraman – Thunive Thunai
1977 – S. P. Muthuraman – Bhuvana Oru Kelvi Kuri
 Bhimsingh – Sila Nerangalil Sila Manithargal
 K. Balachander – Avargal
 Bharathiraja – 16 Vayathinile
 R. Thyagarajan – Aattukara Alamelu
1978 – Bharathiraja – Sigappu Rojakkal
 C. Rudhraiya – Aval Appadithan
 C. V. Sridhar – Ilamai Oonjal Aadukirathu
 Mahendran – Mullum Malarum
 S. P. Muthuraman – Priya
1979 – Mahendran – Uthiri Pookkal
 Balu Mahendra – Azhiyatha Kolangal
 Bharathiraja – Puthiya Vaarpugal
 Durai – Pasi
 K. Balachander – Ninaithale Inikkum

1980s
1980 – K. Balachander – Varumayin Niram Sigappu
 K. Vijayan – Vandichakkaram
 Mahendran – Nenjathai Killathe
 R. Krishnamurthy – Billa
 S. P. Muthuraman – Murattu Kaalai
1981 – K. Balachander – Thaneer Thaneer
 Bharathi-Vasu – Panneer Pushpangal
 Bharathiraja – Alaigal Oivathillai
 G. N. Rangarajan – Meendum Kokila
 K. Bhagyaraj – Andha 7 Naatkal
1982 – Balu Mahendra – Moondram Pirai
 K. Balachander – Agni Sakshi
 Manivannan – Gopurangal Saivathillai
 R. Sundarrajan – Payanangal Mudivathillai
 S. P. Muthuraman – Engeyo Ketta Kural
1983 – A. Jagannathan – Vellai Roja
 Bharathiraja – Man Vasanai
 C. V. Sridhar – Oru Odai Nadhiyagirathu
 K. Bhagyaraj – Mundhanai Mudichu
 T. Rajendar – Thangaikkor Geetham
1984 – K. Balachander – Achamillai Achamillai
 Bharathiraja – Pudhumai Penn
 Manivannan – Nooravathu Naal
 R. C. Sakthi – Sirai
 S. P. Muthuraman – Nallavanukku Nallavan
1985 – Fazil – Poove Poochudava
 K. Balachander – Sindhu Bhairavi
 K. Bhagyaraj – Chinna Veedu
 Bharathiraja – Muthal Mariyathai
 Bharathiraja – Oru Kaidhiyin Diary
1986 – Mani Ratnam – Mouna Ragam
 Bharathiraja – Kadalora Kavithaigal
 K. Balachander – Punnagai Mannan
 R. Sundarrajan – Amman Kovil Kizhakale
 Visu – Samsaram Adhu Minsaram
1987 – Bharathiraja – Vedham Pudhithu
 Balu Mahendra – Rettai Vaal Kuruvi
 K. Bhagyaraj – Enga Chinna Rasa
 Mani Ratnam – Nayakan
 S. A. Chandrasekhar – Neethikku Thandanai
1988 – Balu Mahendra – Veedu
 K. Balachander – Unnal Mudiyum Thambi
 Fazil – En Bommukutty Ammavukku
 Mani Ratnam – Agni Natchathiram
 Suresh Krissna – Sathya
1989 – K. Balachander – Pudhu Pudhu Arthangal
 Fazil – Varusham Padhinaaru
 K. Bhagyaraj – Aararo Aariraro
 R. Parthiban – Pudhea Paadhai
 Singeetham Srinivasa Rao – Apoorva Sagodharargal

1990s
1990 – Mani Ratnam – Anjali
 K. Balachander – Oru Veedu Iru Vaasal
 Singeetham Srinivasa Rao – Michael Madana Kama Rajan
 Vasanth – Keladi Kanmani
 Vikraman – Pudhu Vasantham
1991 – Mani Ratnam – Thalapathi
 K. Balachander – Azhagan
 P. Vasu – Chinna Thambi
 Priyadarshan – Gopura Vasalile
 R. K. Selvamani – Captain Prabhakaran
1992 – K. Balachander – Vaaname Ellai
 Balu Mahendra – Vanna Vanna Pookkal
 Bharathan – Thevar Magan
 Mani Ratnam – Roja
 R. V. Udayakumar – Chinna Gounder
1993 – S. Shankar – Gentleman
 Balu Mahendra – Marupadiyum
 Bharathiraja – Kizhakku Cheemayile
 K. Balachander – Jathi Malli
 Vikraman – Gokulam
1994 – S. Shankar – Kadhalan
 Bharathiraja – Karuthamma
 K. S. Ravikumar – Nattamai
 Santhana Bharathi – Mahanadhi
 Singeetham Srinivasa Rao – Magalir Mattum
1995 – Mani Ratnam – Bombay
 Balu Mahendra – Sathi Leelavathi
 Bharathiraja – Anthimanthaarai
 I. V. Sasi – Kolangal
 Suhasini Maniratnam – Indira
1996 – Agathiyan – Kadhal Kottai
 K. Balachander – Kalki
 S. Shankar – Indian
 Sundar C. – Ullathai Allitha
 Vikraman – Poove Unakkaga
1997 – Cheran – Bharathi Kannamma
 Mani Ratnam – Iruvar
 Rajeev Menon – Minsara Kanavu
 Sundar C. – Arunachalam
 Vikraman – Suryavamsam
1998 – Cheran – Desiya Geetham
 K. S. Ravikumar – Natpukkaga
 S. Shankar – Jeans
 Singeetham Srinivasa Rao – Kadhala Kadhala
 Vikraman – Unnidathil Ennai Koduthen
1999 – Bala – Sethu
 Ezhil – Thulladha Manamum Thullum
 K. S. Ravikumar – Padayappa
 R. Parthiban – Housefull
 S. Shankar – Mudhalvan

2000s
2000 – Rajeev Menon – Kandukondain Kandukondain
 Kamal Haasan – Hey Ram 
 Mani Ratnam – Alaipayuthey
 S. J. Suryah – Kushi
 Vikraman – Vaanathaipola
2001 – Cheran – Pandavar Bhoomi
 Bala – Nandha
 N. Linguswamy – Aanandham
 Vinayan – Kasi
2002 – Mani Ratnam – Kannathil Muthamittal
 A. R. Murugadoss – Ramanaa
 K. S. Ravikumar – Panchatanthiram
 Thangar Bachchan – Azhagi
 Vikraman – Unnai Ninaithu
2003 – Bala – Pithamagan
 Dharani – Dhool
 Gautham Vasudev Menon – Kaaka Kaaka
 Hari – Saamy
 Selvaraghavan – Kadhal Kondain
2004 – Cheran – Autograph
 Balaji Sakthivel – Kaadhal
 Maniratnam – Aayutha Ezhuthu
 Mohan Raja – M. Kumaran S/O Mahalakshmi
 Selvaraghavan – 7G Rainbow Colony
2005 – S. Shankar – Anniyan
 A. R. Murugadoss – Ghajini
 Ameer Sultan – Raam
 Cheran – Thavamai Thavamirundhu
 P. Vasu – Chandramukhi
2006 – Vasanthabalan – Veyyil
 K. S. Ravikumar – Varalaru
 Mysskin – Chithiram Pesuthadi
 S. P. Jananathan – E
 Selvaraghavan – Pudhupettai
2007 – Ameer Sultan – Paruthiveeran
 Prabhu Deva – Pokkiri
 Radha Mohan – Mozhi
 S. Shankar – Sivaji
 Vetrimaaran – Polladhavan
2008 – Sasikumar – Subramaniyapuram
 Gautham Vasudev Menon – Vaaranam Aayiram
 K. S. Ravikumar – Dasavathaaram
 M. Raja – Santosh Subramaniam
 Mithran Jawahar – Yaaradi Nee Mohini
 Myshkin – Anjathe
2009 – Priyadarshan – Kanchivaram
 Bala – Naan Kadavul
 K. V. Anand – Ayan
 Pandiraj – Pasanga
 Samuthirakani – Naadodigal
 Suseenthiran – Vennila Kabadi Kuzhu

2010s
2010 – Vasanthabalan – Angaadi Theru
 A. L. Vijay – Madrasapattinam
 Gautham Vasudev Menon – Vinnaithaandi Varuvaayaa
 Prabu Solomon – Mynaa
 Selvaraghavan – Aayirathil Oruvan
 Shankar – Enthiran
2011 – Vetrimaaran – Aadukalam
 A. L. Vijay – Deiva Thirumagal
 A. R. Murugadoss – Ezhaam Arivu
 K. V. Anand – Ko
 Venkat Prabhu – Mankatha
2012 – Balaji Sakthivel – Vazhakku Enn 18/9
 A. R. Murugadoss – Thuppakki
 Prabu Solomon – Kumki
 S. R. Prabhakaran – Sundarapandian
 Seenu Ramasamy – Neerparavai
2013 – Bala for Paradesi
 Balu Mahendra – Thalaimuraigal
 G. N. R. Kumaravelan – Haridas
 Hari – Singam 2
 Kamal Haasan – Vishwaroopam
 Ram – Thanga Meengal
2014 – A. R. Murugadoss – Kaththi
 Pa. Ranjith – Madras
 Ram Kumar – Mundasupatti
 Vasanthabalan – Kaaviya Thalaivan
 Velraj – Velaiyilla Pattathari
2015 – Mohan Raja  for Thani Oruvan
 Jithu Joseph – Papanasam
 M. Manikandan – Kaaka Muttai
 Mani Ratnam – OK Kanmani
 Roshan Andrews – 36 Vayadhinile
 Shankar – I
 2016 – Sudha Kongara – Irudhi Suttru
 Atlee – Theri
 Gautham Vasudev Menon – Achcham Yenbadhu Madamaiyada
 Pa. Ranjith – Kabali
 Raju Murugan – Joker
 Vetrimaran – Visaranai
  2017 – Pushkar-Gayathri – Vikram Vedha
 Arun Prabu Purushothaman – Aruvi
 Atlee – Mersal
 Dhanush – Power Paandi
 Gopi Nainar – Aramm
 H. Vinoth – Theeran Adhigaram Ondru
  2018 – Ram Kumar – Ratsasan
 A. R. Murugadoss – Sarkar
 C. Premkumar – 96
 Mani Ratnam – Chekka Chivantha Vaanam
 Mari Selvaraj – Pariyerum Perumal
 Vetrimaran – Vada Chennai
2020-2021 – Sudha Kongara – Soorarai Potru'Desingh Periyasamy – Kannum Kannum Kollaiyadithaal Madonne Ashwin – Mandela Mari Selvaraj – KarnanP. Virumandi – Ka Pae Ranasingam Pa. Ranjith – Sarpatta Parambarai  
T. J. Gnanavel – Jai Bhim ''

References

Sources

External links
52nd Annual Awards

Director